Tuvia Bielski (May 8, 1906 – June 12, 1987) was a Belarusian Jewish militant who was leader of the Bielski group, a group of Jewish partisans who set up refugee camps for Jews fleeing the Holocaust during World War II. Their camp was situated in the Naliboki forest, which was part of Poland between World War I and World War II, and which is now in western Belarus.

Biography
Bielski grew up in the only Jewish family in Stankiewicze. The small village in Eastern Poland (now Western Belarus) is located between the towns of Lida and Navahrudak, both of which housed Jewish ghettos during World War II.

Tuvia was the son of David and Beila Bielski, who had 12 children: 10 boys and two girls. Tuvia was the third eldest. His brothers Asael, Alexander ("Zus") and Aron were later to become members of his partisan group.

During the First World War, Bielski served as an interpreter for the Imperial German Army, which were occupying the western territories of the Russian Empire. Already a speaker of Yiddish, he learned to speak the German language from these men and remembered it all his life. In 1927, he was recruited into the Polish Army, where he eventually became a corporal in the 30th Infantry Battalion. After completing his military service, Bielski returned home. In an effort to add to his family's income, he rented another mill. This income was still inadequate, so in 1929, at the age of 23, he married an older woman named Rifka who owned a general store and a large house. The couple lived in the nearby small town of Subotniki.

During the Soviet occupation in 1939, Bielski feared that he would be arrested by the NKVD due to his "bourgeois capitalist" occupation, so he moved to Lida. Before Tuvia left Subotniki he urged his wife, Rifka, to join him in the move to Lida. She refused.

In Soviet-controlled Lida, Bielski met and fell in love with another woman named  Sonia Warshavsky. The love affair became serious. In late 1939, Bielski divorced his wife, Rifka and married Sonia, though they were not yet "officially" married due to wartime conditions. Sonia was killed while taking shelter with others in a peasant home. Not long after, Tuvia married Lila "Lilka" Tiktin, who was only 17 at the time. They knew each other before the war and stayed married until his death 44 years later.

World War II

When Operation Barbarossa broke out, Tuvia, Zus, and Asael were called up by their army units to fight against the Nazi German occupiers. Tuvia recalls: "Suddenly about fifty planes (Luftwaffe) flew over the town dropping incendiary bombs. In a very few minutes the entire place was on fire. The commander called us in, ordered us to leave the burning town and regroup in a forest about five kilometers from there. We were to continue working. We carried out his command but soon after we began our job in the forest another wave of planes flew over the area and set the woods on fire. The commander called us in and said: 'Friends, you are on your own!'" After the units disbanded, the Bielski brothers fled to Stankiewicze, where their parents lived. In early July 1941, a German army unit arrived in Stankiewicze and Jewish residents were moved to a ghetto in Nowogródek. The four Bielski brothers managed to flee to the nearby forest. Their parents, two of their brothers and other family members, including Rifka and Zus' wife and child, were killed in the ghetto on December 8, 1941.

Tuvia Bielski led a group of Jewish partisans who hid in the forest. Although always hunted by Nazis, Bielski's group continued to grow. They periodically raided the ghettos to help people escape. They lived in the forests for over two years, and in their camp, they built a school, a hospital, and a nursery. As the leader of the Bielski partisans, his aim was to save the lives of Jews, where he could make a large impact, rather than getting involved with skirmishes with Nazis, where their effect would be negligible. Thus, they did not explicitly seek to attack railroads and roads that the German Nazis were using as supply routes but did sometimes carry out such attacks in order to save Jews at risk of being killed by Nazis in the Holocaust. The Bielski partisans ultimately saved the lives of more than 1,200 Jews.

In 1944, Asael Bielski was conscripted into the Soviet Army and killed in battle in Germany.

Later life
After the war, Tuvia, Zus and their wives went to Israel via Romania, and ultimately immigrated to the United States in 1956. They joined their older brother Walter in New York, where he had gone before the war. Tuvia and Zus ran a small trucking firm in New York City for 30 years. He remained married to Lilka for the remainder of their lives.  They had three children: sons Michael and Robert, and daughter Ruth, and ten grandchildren.  Granddaughter Sharon Rennert made a documentary about her family called In Our Hands: The Legacy of the Bielski Partisans.

When Tuvia died in 1987, he was nearly penniless. He was initially buried on Long Island; one year after his death, his remains were exhumed and taken to Jerusalem, where he was given a state funeral with full military honors in 1988. The exact grave is at Har Tamir - a part of Har HaMenuchot. The following location is in Hebrew using Latin letters: Gush taf-bet, Chelka daled, Shura 19, kever 11 (block 402, section 4, row 19, grave 11).

Legacy
Daniel Craig portrayed Tuvia in the film Defiance (2008), which has been criticised in Poland due to its omission of the alleged involvement of the Bielski group in a massacre of Polish civilians conducted by Soviet-aligned partisans in Naliboki. The Naliboki massacre was the subject of an official inquiry by the Polish Institute of National Remembrance's Commission for the Prosecution of Crimes against the Polish Nation. As of 2009, the investigation had not concluded. Bielski partisan survivors have denied any involvement.

References

External links

Tuvia Bielski: Partisan Leader
 Voices on Antisemitism Interview with Daniel Craig from the United States Holocaust Memorial Museum
  Holocaust Resistance: Tuvia Bielski from the Jewish Virtual Library

People from Lida District
20th-century Polish Jews
Belarusian partisans
Jewish partisans
Holocaust survivors
Burials at Har HaMenuchot
1906 births
1987 deaths
Soviet partisans
German military personnel of World War I
Polish military personnel of World War II
Soviet emigrants to Israel
Israeli emigrants to the United States